Calmos is a 1976 French film directed by Bertrand Blier. A comedy that explores the battle of the sexes, often explicitly, it satirises both the rise of feminism in France and traditional attitudes of Frenchmen.

Synopsis
Paul, a married gynecologist in Paris, is weary of women's bodies and needs. Leaving a patient in the stirrups, he heads for the freedom of the street. There he meets Albert, who has that morning left his wife. Each recognises a kindred spirit, and the two travel to a remote village, were they rent a house and lead a relaxed bachelor existence. Their enthusiasm for good food and wine earns them the friendship of the village priest. However, the idyll ends when their wives track them down and  coerce the priest, after negotiation, into recalling them to their marital duties.

After weeks of freedom, a weekend at home with the wife is more than either can bear. They run away to open country, where they are joined by other men who cannot stand the demands of women and are fed by sympathetic farmers. This pastoral fraternity is scattered by a tank crewed by women, and the fleeing Paul and Albert are captured by a squad of female infantry. Their captain says the two will have to pleasure them all, starting with her, but after negotiation lets them make a run for it. Once caught again, they are taken to an institute in Paris and operated on. Fixed to their beds and with enormous erections, women are let in two at a time for strictly two minutes of copulation.

Years later, aged and shrunken to miniature size, they are living on a mountain top and have made themselves tiny hang gliders. Caught in a storm, their machines are wafted over the ocean and drop them in a strange cleft by a tropical beach. Exploring it, they fall into a soft-walled cavern that throbs. Viewers realise the two are inside the body of a woman....

Cast
 Jean-Pierre Marielle as Paul Dufour, a gynaecologist
 Jean Rochefort as Albert
 Bernard Blier as Émile
 Brigitte Fossey as Suzanne Dufour
 Valérie Mairesse as Claudine
 Micheline Kahn as Geneviève
 Sylvie Joly as The Doctor
 Claude Piéplu as The Old Soldier
 Dora Doll as The Amazon Chief
 Dominique Lavanant as The short-sighted woman
 Marthe Villalonga & Françoise Bertin as Employees of the lab
 Liliane Rovère as A Soldier

References

External links
 

1970s sex comedy films
1976 films
Films directed by Bertrand Blier
1970s French-language films
French sex comedy films
1976 comedy films
1970s French films